Tungal  is a village in the southern state of Karnataka, India. It is located in the Jamkhandi taluk of Bagalkot district in Karnataka.

Demographics
 India census, Tungal had a population of 6689 with 3442 males and 3247 females.

See also
Bagalkot
Districts of Karnataka

References

3. http://stg2.kar.nic.in/gpportal/rpt_SabhaDetails.aspx

External links
http://Bagalkot.nic.in/

Villages in Bagalkot district